The 2004 Women's  World Team Squash Championships were held in Amsterdam, Netherlands and took place from September 26 until October 2, 2004.

Seeds

Results

First round

Pool A

Pool B

Pool C

Pool D

Quarter finals

Semi finals

Third Place Play Off

Final

References

See also 
World Team Squash Championships
World Squash Federation
World Open (squash)

World Squash Championships
2004 in women's squash
Squash tournaments in the Netherlands
International sports competitions hosted by the Netherlands
Squash
Women